The doctrine of the Three Suns or three stages of the end-time, or Three Ages, is a teleological and eschatological doctrine found in some Chinese salvationist religions and schools of Confucianism.

According to the doctrine, the absolute principle, in many salvationist sects represented as the Wusheng Laomu, divides the end time into three stages, each of which is governed by a different Buddha sent by the Mother to save humanity: the "Green Sun" (qingyang) governed by Dīpankara Buddha, the "Red Sun" (hongyang) by Gautama Buddha, and the current "White Sun" (baiyang) by Maitreya. In different sects the three periods are known by slightly different names, variations originated by oral transmission of the teaching. The doctrine is especially important in the Xiantiandao group of sects, the most notable one being Yiguandao.

Origins
The Three Suns doctrine places itself in a sect tradition ("Sanyangism", 三阳教 Sānyángjiào, "teaching of the Three Suns") flourishing at least since the Ming dynasty. It can be traced back to a Taoist school named Hunyuan, from the concept of hunyuan ("original chaos") that existed before hundun ("still chaos") and is the beginning of primordial qi (yuanqi) according to some Taoist cosmologies. Other possible origins go back to the entry of Maitreya beliefs into China. These concepts became part of the folk tradition and were incorporated in the sect milieu.

In the earliest sects of the Ming period, the Lord of Original Chaos (Hunyuan Zhu) represents the origin of the universe developing through three stages, yang, or cosmic periods. The earliest written evidence of this doctrine can be found in the Huangji jieguo baojuan, published in 1430. In this text the three stages are already associated to the three Buddhas: Dipankara, Gautama and Maitreya. The Green Sun Assembly was held at the end of the first period, the Red Sun Assembly in the second one and the White Sun Assembly will be held in the third one.

Confucian doctrine
The doctrine of the Three Ages is discussed in Neo-Confucian and New Confucian teachings, the Gongyang Commentary and the Datong shu of Kang Youwei. The Confucian interpretation is comparable to the doctrine of the Spirit in Hegelian thought. Ren ("humaneness", the essence of human being) develops and matures progressively to higher stages in history.

Kang saw history as progressing from an Age of Disorder to the Age of Approaching Peace, and ending at the Age of Universal Peace. In the third age humankind attains Datong, ren is fully realised as people transcend their selfishness and become one with "all under Heaven".

Yiguandao doctrine
Currently, Yiguandao doctrine about Three Ages is as follows:

See also
 Chinese salvationist religions
 Eschatology
 Xiantiandao
 Joachim of Fiore
 Five Suns

References

Sources
 Hubert Michael Seiwert. Popular Religious Movements and Heterodox Sects in Chinese History. Brill, 2003. 
 Tay, Wei Leong. Kang Youwei: The Martin Luther of Confucianism and His Vision of Confucian Modernity and Nation. In: Haneda Masashi, Secularization, Religion and the State, University of Tokyo Center for Philosophy, 2010.

Teleology
Eschatology
Chinese salvationist religions
Yiguandao